Lemon Creek (Lingít: Eixh'gulhéen) is a neighborhood in Juneau, Alaska, United States. It is the site of the Lemon Creek Correctional Center. The neighborhood is bisected by the namesake Lemon Creek, which provides runoff for local glaciers.

The area is mixed use, and contains heavy concentrations of housing and industrial areas. An industrial park in the area includes Juneau's Costco and The Home Depot stores, as well as the Alaskan Brewing Company. Also in the neighborhood are the headquarters of both the Juneau Police Department and Alaska Electric Light & Power. The area is the location of the cities primary landfill, and city operated hazardous waste collection facility as well.

The Lemon name is said to come from traveling miner John Lemon, who reportedly had a placer mine on the creek in 1879.

Demographics

Lemon Creek appeared once on the 1970 U.S. Census as an unincorporated village. It was merged into the city of Juneau the same year.

References

Populated places in Juneau, Alaska